Jean-Bernard Pommier (born 17 August 1944 in Beziers), is a French pianist and conductor.

Early life and education 
Jean-Bernard Pommier began playing the piano at the age of four and gave his first public concert at the age of seven. He had his first lessons with the Russian schooled pianist Mina Koslova in Béziers. His father, who was an organist, would bring him to meet and play for Pablo Casals. At the age of 14, he moved to Paris to study piano with Yves Nat and Pierre Sancan and conducting with Eugene Bigot at the Paris Conservatoire. Later, he also worked with Eugene Istomin in New York.

International recognition came fast after winning the Berlin Young Musicians International Competition in 1960.

Tchaikovsky Competition 
In 1962, aged seventeen, he was the youngest finalist at the International Tchaikovsky Competition in Moscow. He was awarded First Honourable Mention by a jury presided over by Emil Gilels.

Musical relationship with Eugene Istomin 
In 1963 Jean-Bernard Pommier and Eugene Istomin met each other in Sofia where Pommier played Ravel's Concerto in G minor for the first time. Istomin complimented him on the Ravel Concert and suggested they would meet again. They established a transatlantic relationship punctuated by Istomins travels to Europe. Istomin said about the relationship: "It was not a master-student relationship, but an ongoing dialogue between colleagues. Jean-Bernard’s career was already well launched! I cannot take the glory for this – it is Jean-Bernard who deserves all the credit. I am honoured to have been his teacher -the teacher of an exceptional student!”. They would go on to have a friendship of over forty years, performing together and making recordings.

Career 
After the Tchaikovsky Competition, he began recording with EMI. Ten years later, he began a long period of collaboration with Herbert von Karajan and the Berlin Philharmonic Orchestra in Berlin and Salzburg. He plays with many other distinguished musicians including Boulez, Barenboim, Haitink, Mazur, Mehta, Muti, Rattle. His recital and concerto appearances have included major centres such as London, Vienna, Berlin, Leipzig, Dresden, Amsterdam, Paris, Moscow, Chicago and New York. Jean-Bernard Pommier is enjoying an active career as a conductor working with major orchestras in Europe and America such as the San Francisco Symphony, l'Orchestre de Paris, l'Orchestre Philharmonique de Radio France, the Philharmonia, the Royal Philharmonic Orchestra, Rotterdam Philharmonic, RAI Turin, Tonhalle Zurich, Warsaw Philharmonic, Czech Philharmonic, Budapest Symphony, Leipzig Radio, Belgium National Orchestra, Orchestre de la Suisse Romande and Salzburg Mozarteum. Pommier also frequently takes up the dual role of pianist and conductor with the Chamber Orchestra of Europe, the Northern Sinfonia of England, the Sinfonia Varsovia, the Israel Chamber Orchestra, the Chamber Orchestra of Lausanne, the English chamber orchestra or the Scottish Chamber Orchestra. His chamber music partners have included Isaac Stern, Itzhak Perlman, Pinchas Zukerman, Leonard Rose, Alexander Schneider, Jean-Pierre Rampal, Paul Tortellier, Maurice Bourgue, Jaime Laredo, Josef Suk and the Guarneri and Vermeer Quartets.

He has given masterclasses in Chicago, London, Lausanne, Rotterdam, Durham, Barcelona, Melbourne and Shanghai.

Previously, the artistic director of the Northern Sinfonia, Principal conductor of the Orchestra Filarmonica di Torino, Principal conductor of the Sofia Philharmonic and artistic director of the Festival de Menton, he now tours widely.

He is the recipient of the highest- ranking accolades of France – the Ordre du Mérite National and of the Légion d’Honneur.

He recorded the Sonata for two pianists by Claude Bolling with the composer in 1972.

Teaching 
Since 2018 he has been a professor in the Ecole Normale de Musique de Paris Alfred Cortot in Paris, France.

Academie Musiké Association 
Jean-Berard Pommier started AMA (Academie Musiké Association) where he teaches piano and chamber music to young talented artists from all over the world.

References

1944 births
Living people
French male conductors (music)
21st-century French male classical pianists
20th-century French male classical pianists
People from Béziers
Conservatoire de Paris alumni
21st-century French conductors (music)